Jan Birger Store (born  1 April 1948 Kokkola) is a Finnish diplomat. He served as Finnish Permanent Representative in the European Union in Brussels from 2008 to 2013. Store's duties were also preparing for membership decisions at the Coreper-Committee.

Store worked  also at the EU Delegation as a substitute for the Permanent Representative in the European Union from 1995 to 2000.

He has also been Finnish Ambassador to Poland from 2004-2008 and as the  Head of Department for European Affairs  at the Ministry for Foreign Affairs.

In 2013 Store was awarded the  Order of the White Rose of Finland First Class Commander of the White Rose of Finland

After retirement in 2016, Store started to work at the communication  and lobbying company Miltton in  Brussels where his task is communicating and influencing the EU parliamentarians.

Store is a Master of Political Sciences by education. He graduated from the Åbo Akademi in  1972. He is married and has two adult children.

References 

1948 births
Ambassadors of Finland to Poland
People from Kokkola
Living people
Åbo Akademi University alumni